Janus Capital Group, Inc. v. First Derivative Traders, 564 U.S. 135 (2011), was a case before the Supreme Court of the United States in which the Court held that a service provider cannot be held liable in a private action under SEC Rule 10b-5.

References

External links
 

2011 in United States case law
United States Supreme Court cases
United States Supreme Court cases of the Roberts Court